The Religion War is a 2004 novel by Dilbert creator Scott Adams, and the sequel to his novella God's Debris. This book takes place right before the last chapter of that book. Adams has asserted that it is his two religion-themed novels, and not Dilbert, which “will be his ultimate legacy.”

Plot summary
The delivery boy from the first book, who is now the Avatar, must stop an epic clash of civilizations between the Western world, led by Christian extremist General Horatio Cruz, and the Middle East, led by Muslim extremist Al-Zee. To accomplish this task, the Avatar decides to find the "Prime Influencer", a person who, he feels, can indirectly influence all the decisions people make by virtue of responsibility, from fashion to the election of the President. He attempts to do so by enlisting a talented and arrogant programmer at Global Information Corporation (G.I.C.) (an all-encompassing, world-wide future sort of T.I.A. created out of fear of terrorism) to analyze G.I.C.'s massive databases. Also, people's phones are, in the name of preventing terrorist communications, restricted to only calling certain contacts a person has that have been approved by the Department of Communications; this fact ultimately comes back in the book's climax.

The Avatar applies his unparalleled ability to identify developing patterns and accurately determine the most probable results of a situation to accurately predict the war plans of both Cruz and Al-Zee.  He subsequently uses his ability to recognize even the vaguest patterns (which makes him seem to know more than he actually does) to bypass guards, escape interrogations, and ultimately win an audience with the warring leaders.

Ultimately, the Avatar fails to stop the coming of the war. However, at the conclusion of the book, the Prime Influencer, who turns out to be an opinionated café owner whom the Avatar had met previously by chance, launches a simple, yet catchy, phrase (If God is so smart, why do you fart?) that spreads throughout the world like a virus thanks to an advanced computer worm, named Giver-of-Data (G.o.D.), launched by the G.I.C. programmer shortly before his death, which unlocked everyone's phones, linked them to automatic translation systems, and disabled call-billing. According to the story, "Once you heard it, you could never forget it." It was this phrase that finally captured the collective imaginations of ordinary people, causing them to reevaluate the basis of their notions of a god.  This ultimately led to the elimination of fundamentalist religious practices throughout the world, which, in turn, resulted in the end of the Religion War.

Reception
One review observes:

Another notes: “In this frenetically paced sequel to Adams’ best-selling “thought experiment,” God’s Debris, the smartest man in the world is on a mission to stop a cataclysmic war between Christian and Muslim forces and save civilization.”

See also

God's Debris

References

External links
Information at Andrews McMeel Publishing
Adams' announcement in the Dilbert Newsletter 57

2004 American novels
2004 science fiction novels
Books by Scott Adams
Andrews McMeel Publishing books